Wola Zambrowska  is a village in north-east Poland near Zambrów in Podlaskie Voivodeship. Wola Zambrowska is the largest village in Gmina Zambrów.

History 
In 1423, the Mazovian prince Janusz I gave the Łętowo forest and Stawiska seat to Ślubowo knights. In 1526, Wola Zambrowska became royal property. Wola Zambrowska was a big village for many years - in 1921 it had 284 inhabitants and had grown to about 1,000 inhabitants in 2007.

Since 7 February 2007, Jolanta Wielgat has been the village administrator.

Villages in Zambrów County